The Dzüko Valley is a valley located at the borders of the states of Nagaland and Manipur in Northeast India. This valley is well known for its natural environment, seasonal flowers and flora & fauna.

It is situated at an altitude of 2452 m above sea level. The valley is famous for its wide range of flowers in every season but the most famous one is the Dzüko Lily and it is found only in this valley.

Etymology 
The word Dzüko is originally derived from the Viswema dialect of the Angamis Dzüko which loosely translated means Soulless and Dull referring to when some ancestors of Viswema who moved out to establish a new village in Dzüko, due to the unfavorable weather conditions they were unable to harvest crops which led them to say "the valley is very beautiful but is dull and soulless."

A common misconception is that Dzüko derives its meaning from the Angami word which translates to Cold Water referring to the ice cold streams that flows through the valley.

Access

Trekking route 
The main entry is from the foothills of Viswema where one can travel to the rest house above Teyozwü Hill by a Tata Sumo taxi. From here one has to climb forty minutes to the top of the mountain (Khiyoke). This is where Dzüko starts but the main valley is still another two hours' walk away. One can exit the valley from the same route but if one is planning to come back by foot, the Jakhama route is shorter.
Also it can be reached in five hours of trek from Mount Tempü of Senapati district of Manipur. The new five-hour trek route was opened by MMTA (Manipur Mountaineering and Trekking Association).

Transportation 
The Asian Highway 1 and also the NH-2 passes through its foothills. The nearest airport is Dimapur Airport at Chümoukedima–Dimapur about 96 kilometres (60 miles) away from Viswema while the Bir Tikendrajit International Airport is located about 120 kilometres (75 miles) south of Viswema.

There is a Helipad just next to the Guest house however no service is seen in the last few years.

Ecology 
The valley borders a region of old-growth forest, and is home to several rare and endangered species of flora and fauna, including the Dzüko Lily (Lilium mackliniae) and the Blyth's tragopan, which is the state bird of Nagaland. A number of other rare species are also found here, including several rhododendron species, plants such as the aconita nagaram, and fauna including the Asian golden cat, the Hollock Gibbon, the Dzuko Valley horned toad (Megophrys dzukou), several species of leopard including the clouded leopard, the Asiatic black bear, the capped langur, the stump-tailed macaque, and the serow.

It has periodically been threatened by forest fires, which tend to spread quickly due to prevalent wind conditions and are difficult to fight because of the inaccessible terrain around the valley. In 2006, a forest fire destroyed 20 kilometers of forest in the valley before it was contained. The 2020–21 Dzüko Valley wildfires destroyed an estimated 200 acres of forest land, as well as significant flora in the valley itself.

Ownership 
There has been disputes for years between Manipur and Nagaland regarding the ownership of Dzüko Valley.

Historically, the valley is an extent of the territory of Viswema under present-day Nagaland but today it is jointly preserved with the Southern Angami Public Organization which is also based in Nagaland. However, politically, the valley shares both Manipur and Nagaland state territories which the majority of the area falls under Manipur state boundary according to the map of the Survey of India.

Gallery

See also 
 Kezol-tsa Forest
 Mount Tempü

References

External links

 Dzukou Valley Trek
 Hues of Dzukou

Viswema
Valleys of India
Landforms of Nagaland
Landforms of Manipur